The 2005 Losail Superbike World Championship round was the first round of the 2005 Superbike World Championship. It took place on the weekend of February 24–26, 2005 at the Losail International Circuit in Qatar.

Results

Superbike race 1 classification

Superbike race 2 classification

Supersport race classification

References
 Superbike Race 1
 Superbike Race 2
 Supersport Race

Superbike World Championship
Losail